The Battle of Badghis was fought in 654 between the Karen family and their Hephthalite allies against the Rashidun Caliphate.

History 
In 651, the Arabs had invaded Khorasan, and by 652, they had conquered most of the region. However, in 654, the Karenids under Karin, along with the Hephthalites under Nezak Tarkan, made an insurrection against the Arabs. The rebellion spread in Herat, Badghis and Quhistan, and later they even managed to repel the Arabs from Nishapur and Balkh. During the same period the people of Zaranj rebelled, however, the Arabs under Abd Allah ibn Amir managed to defeat them and kill Karin.

References

Sources 

Badghis
654
Badghis
Badghis
History of Badghis Province
Muslim conquest of Persia